Star Box is a 2011 Philippine television talk show broadcast by GMA Network. Hosted by Ali Sotto, Papa Jack, MM Magno and MJ Magno, it premiered on April 4, 2011. The show concluded on May 13, 2011 with a total of 28 episodes. It was replaced by Kapuso Movie Festival in its timeslot.

Ratings
According to AGB Nielsen Philippines' Mega Manila household television ratings, the pilot episode of Star Box earned a 7.7% rating.

References

2011 Philippine television series debuts
2011 Philippine television series endings
Filipino-language television shows
GMA Network original programming
Philippine television talk shows
Television series by TAPE Inc.